The enzyme monoterpene ε-lactone hydrolase (EC 3.1.1.83, MLH; systematic name isoprop(en)ylmethyloxepan-2-one lactonohydrolase catalyses the reaction

 (1) isoprop(en)ylmethyloxepan-2-one + H2O  6-hydroxyisoprop(en)ylmethylhexanoate (general reaction)
 (2) 4-isopropenyl-7-methyloxepan-2-one + H2O  6-hydroxy-3-isopropenylheptanoate
 (3) 7-isopropyl-4-methyloxepan-2-one + H2O  6-hydroxy-3,7-dimethyloctanoate

The enzyme catalyses the ring opening of ε-lactones in Gram-positive bacterium Rhodococcus erythropolis DCL14.

References

External links 
 

EC 3.1.1